6 Frigates, frigate six, or variation, may refer to:

Military units
 6th Frigate Squadron (1950-2002) administrative unit of the British Royal Navy
 Original six frigates of the United States Navy, ships authorized with the establishment of the U.S. Navy
 , the sixth frigate of the original U.S. Navy to be completed
 , Brooke-class frigate of the U.S. Navy (frigate with pennant numbered 6)

Other uses
 Six Frigates: The Epic History of the Founding of the US Navy (2006 book) military history book

See also
 Frigate (disambiguation)